The Laan van Meerdervoort is an avenue in The Hague. At a length of 5.8 km, it is (as of 2011) the longest avenue in the Netherlands.

The Laan van Meerdervoort is more or less an isogloss of two subvarieties of The Hague dialect. The posher variety called dàftig, Haegs or bekakt Haags is spoken roughly north of it, whereas a low-class variety called plat Haags or Hèègs is spoken roughly south of the Laan van Meerdervort.

Notable buildings
 Gymnasium Haganum
 Museum Mesdag

References

Streets in The Hague